Medina de Pomar is a municipality and town located in the province of Burgos, Castile and León, Spain. It is situated 77 km from Bilbao, and 88 km from Burgos, the capital of the province, 8 kilometres from Villarcayo and about 20 km from Espinosa de los Monteros, which are the most important towns in the surroundings of Medina de Pomar.

Medina de Pomar is part of the Comarca of Las Merindades with its varied landscape. The rivers Nela, Trueba and Salón, the steep slopes of the Tesla, the pine forests of Losa and flat surfaces that are dedicated nowadays to the cultivation of cereal, potatoes and lettuces.

History

The foundation of the town is attributed to a group of Mozarabs in the 12th century.

Main sights
The Alcázar de los Condestables de Castilla, was built on the south-west corner of the city's walls. It is a 14th-century fortification erected during the reign of Henry II of Castile.
Sanctuary of Nuestra Señora del Salcinar y del Rosario, is a chapel that houses the Virgin of Rosario, patron saint of the city. Lends its name to the great festivals of the city in October.Originally called Santa Maria del Salcinar (for being surrounded by the river willow), is now called Our Lady of the Rosary, thanks to the vow the council medines did and who took her as patron because of the victory of Battle of Lepanto (1571). It is the most beloved church by the city citizens and proof of this is that many of them choose it to get married there.
Monastery of Santa Clara, founded in 1313,is located in the south of the city, near the Hospital of Vera Cruz and near the Hermitage of San Millán. In its interior there is a church, the family vault of the Fernandez de Velasco and the Museum of the Constables of Castile. It also has a cozy inn and a meeting place. During its seven centuries of history it has been inhabited by a community of Poor Clares, devoted to prayer and work.
Arch of la Cadena. One of the gates that gave access to the walled city was the "Arco de la Cadena", which marked the Real road to Burgos.
Arch of la Juderia.It corresponds to another of the five gates that gave access to the city, in this case the old Jewish district, hence its name. It is a building of the sixteenth century, possibly replacing an older one. The main focus currently corresponds with  Nuño Rasura Street.

People from Medina de Pomar 
Ramón Chíes (1846–1893) – Journalist, editor, and political activist.
Chus Pereda (1938–2011) – Football midfielder and manager.

References

 City Council of Medina de Pomar
 Rural Development Center of the Merindades

Municipalities in the Province of Burgos